Edward John Rebar is an American biologist. Rebar is the senior vice president and chief technology officer of Sangamo Therapeutics. He researches the use of zinc fingers as a protein platform.

Education 

Edward John Rebar earned a Bachelor of Science in biochemistry from Rutgers University. He completed a Doctor of Philosophy in biophysics and structural biology from Massachusetts Institute of Technology. His 1997 dissertation was titled Selection studies of zinc finger-DNA recognition. His doctoral advisor was Carl Pabo. Rebar worked as a post-doctoral fellow at the University of California, Berkeley.

Career 

Rebar joined Sangamo Therapeutics in 1998. He worked on the zinc finger protein platform developed by the company. In 2018, Rebar replaced Michael C. Holmes as the senior vice president and chief technology officer of Sangamo.

References 

20th-century American biologists
Living people
21st-century American biologists
American biophysicists
Rutgers University alumni
Massachusetts Institute of Technology School of Science alumni
21st-century American businesspeople
American chief technology officers
Year of birth missing (living people)
20th-century American businesspeople